William Loftus may refer to:
 William Loftus (archaeologist), British geologist, naturalist, explorer and archaeological excavator
 William Loftus (British Army officer), British Army officer and Member of Parliament
 William Loftus (Canadian football), Canadian football player